The U.S. state of Washington, located in the Pacific Northwest, has several major mountain ranges that are traversed various passes. The state is divided by the Cascade Range, which have the highest passes, and is also home to the Olympic Mountains, Selkirk Mountains, and Blue Mountains.

See also

 List of mountain ranges in Washington (state)

References

Mountain passes
Mountain passes